The "Articles of the Church of Christ" was an 1829 revelation purportedly given by God to Oliver Cowdery in the early history of the Latter Day Saint movement.  The original Articles were never included in the Mormon canon; however, the language of much of the Articles found its way into various sections of the Book of Commandments and the Doctrine and Covenants, such as D&C 20.  The Article begins, "A commandment from God unto Oliver how he should build up his church & the manner thereof—"

External links
The facsimile of the Articles and a historical introduction can be found at http://josephsmithpapers.org/paperSummary?target=x6557
Compare the version by Joseph Smith "Articles and Covenants" accepted in a general conference the following year (1830) at http://josephsmithpapers.org/paperSummary?target=x4904

1829 documents
1829 in Christianity
19th-century Christian texts
Latter Day Saint texts
Works in the style of the King James Version
Church of Christ (Latter Day Saints)
Revelation in Mormonism